Uwilingiyimana is a Rwandan surname. Persons with this surname include:

Agathe Uwilingiyimana (1953–1994), prime minister of Rwanda 1993–1994, Rwanda's first and so far only female prime minister
Juvénal Uwilingiyimana (1951–2005), minister of commerce of Rwanda, minister of trade of Rwanda

Surnames